The 1949 Grand Prix season was the fourth post-war year for Grand Prix racing and the final year before the beginning of the Formula One World Championship. It was the third season of FIA Formula One motor racing, though some of that season's Grands Prix still used other formulas. Races which were run to Formula One criteria restricted engines to 1.5 litres supercharged or 4.5 litres naturally aspirated. There was no organised championship in 1949, although several of the more prestigious races were recognised as Grandes Épreuves (great trials) by the FIA. Alberto Ascari and Juan Manuel Fangio proved to be the most successful drivers, each winning five Grands Prix. Maserati's cars were the most successful brand, winning 10 of the season's 27 Grand Prix races.

Season review

Grandes Épreuves

Other Grands Prix

Statistics

Grand Prix Winners

Drivers

Manufacturers

References

Grand Prix seasons